Servaas Nicolaas "Niek" du Toit is a former South African arms dealer, former mercenary and former colonel of 32 Battalion and the 5th Reconnaissance Commando. He was implicated in the plot to overthrow Teodoro Obiang of Equatorial Guinea.

Failed coup and aftermath 
He went on trial in Malabo along with 18 other men accused of being the advance party for 70 other mercenaries. All were found guilty and although the prosecution asked for the death penalty, du Toit received a 34-year sentence (to be served in Malabo's Black Beach prison).

His job in the coup d'état was reportedly to supply the mercenaries with arms including AK-47s, RPGs, PK machine guns and mortars, and to secure the control tower at the Malabo airport and change the frequency to establish communication with the incoming plane from Zimbabwe carrying more mercenaries. After his capture, he appeared on South African television announcing the failure of the coup and the names of co-conspirators. Niek Du Toit served five years and eight months of a 34-year sentence in a cell measuring 150 cm  x 210 cm, had been tortured, beaten, starved and kept for much of the time in solitary confinement. They were burned with cigarettes, beaten with rifle butts, hung upside down and beaten, contracted malaria multiple times and was refused treatment, amongst many tortures endures by the 18 men. Of the 18 mercenaries, 4 of them returned alive. Simon Mann had bribed the prison guards to fetch food from the hotel across the street, claiming it was good enough for his co-conspirators but not for him, he even had a treadmill installed in his prison cell while Niek and the others were handcuffed to the beds and beaten if they tried to move.

He was given a presidential pardon by Equatorial Guinea's dictator ruler, President Obiang, on 3 November 2009, and was released, along with Sergio Fernando Patricio Cardoso, Jose Passocas Domingos and Georges Olympic Nunez Alerson. Simon Mann was also released and was back in England by 6 November 2009.

Du Toit has since retired as a career soldier and is currently working in vehicle sales in Yemen.

See also
Simon Mann
Mark Thatcher

References

Literature
 James Brabazon: My Friend the Mercenary, Grove Press (March 22, 2011),  Biography of Nick du Toit.

External links
 "My Friend, the Mercenary From Hell" by Noah Shachtman, 25 April 2008
 BBC News article on the verdicts handed to the coup force, BBC Online, 26 November 2004 
 "No 'buy recommendation' for a book about a former mercenary" by Dr. Alexander von Paleske, Nachrichten Heute, 2 August 2010
 "A Coup for a Mountain of Wonga"
 Boeremag brothers convicted in Pretoria, South Africa on charges of high treason, Silobreaker.com article on convictions of Andre and Mike du Toit, 27 July 2012
 Interview with Tracy McVeigh, The Observer online, 12 June 2010

History of Equatorial Guinea
Living people
Afrikaner people
Recipients of Equatoguinean presidential pardons
South African Army personnel
South African military personnel of the Border War
Place of birth missing (living people)
Year of birth missing (living people)
South African mercenaries